

The Cape Leeuwin Lighthouse is a lighthouse located on the headland of Cape Leeuwin,  the most south-westerly point on the mainland of the Australian Continent, in the state of Western Australia.

Cape Leeuwin Lighthouse was constructed by a company led by M. C. Davies, with George Temple Poole supervising the construction of the light and designing the keepers' quarters. The light tower which is built of local stone was originally designed to show two lights – a higher white light and a lower red light. Although the foundations were completed, the lower light was never installed. It was opened with great ceremony in 1895 by John Forrest, the Premier of Western Australia. Until June 1982 the lens was rotated by a counter weight driving clockwork mechanism, and the beacon was a pressure kerosene mantle type. A radio navigation beacon was commissioned in 1955 and operated until 1992. The lighthouse was automated in 1982. The lighthouse, besides being a navigational aid, serves as an important automatic weather station.  The lighthouse's buildings and grounds are now vested in the local tourism body and the single (1960s) and double (1980s) communications towers that were north-west of the lighthouse, seen in older photographs of Cape Leeuwin, have been removed.

The nearest functioning lighthouse north of Cape Leeuwin is the much smaller Cape Hamelin lighthouse, just south of the Hamelin Bay camping area.

The young Felix von Luckner, later a German World War I war hero, noted for his long voyage on the Seeadler during which he captured 14 enemy ships, was briefly assistant lighthouse keeper. He abandoned the job when discovered with his hotel-keeper's daughter by her father.

International Lighthouse Day was celebrated at Cape Leeuwin lighthouse for the first time in 2004. The climb to the viewing deck consists of 176 steps.

Picture gallery

See also

 List of lighthouses and lightvessels in Australia
 Cape Leeuwin water wheel

References

External links 

 
 Cape Leeuwin Lighthouse tour information
 - List of WA lighthouses - check link to Cape Leeuwin

Lighthouses completed in 1895
Lighthouses in Western Australia
Museums in Western Australia
Lighthouse museums in Australia
1895 establishments in Australia
Commonwealth Heritage List places in Western Australia
Cape Leeuwin, Western Australia
Heritage-listed lighthouses in Australia
State Register of Heritage Places in the Shire of Augusta-Margaret River